Rodney Michael Colwell (born 14 June 1958) is a Canadian sports shooter. He competed in two events at the 1992 Summer Olympics.

International competition
At the 1992 Summer Olympics (held in Barcelona, Spain), Colwell represented Team Canada in the Men's 10 metre air pistol event. He scored 577 in the qualifying round, ultimately tying for 14th with three other competitors. He did not make it into the finals, which Wang Yifu (China) would later win. Colwell also competed in the qualifying round of the Men's ISSF 50 meter pistol event. He scored 543 and tied for 37th with four other competitors. Kanstantsin Lukashyk of the Unified Team went on to win the event that year.

References

External links
 

1958 births
Living people
Canadian male sport shooters
Olympic shooters of Canada
Shooters at the 1992 Summer Olympics
People from Chilliwack
Sportspeople from British Columbia
Pan American Games medalists in shooting
Pan American Games bronze medalists for Canada
Shooters at the 1991 Pan American Games
Medalists at the 1991 Pan American Games
20th-century Canadian people